This is a list of all tornadoes that were confirmed by local offices of the National Weather Service in the United States from September and October 2015.

United States yearly total

September

September 8 event

September 10 event

September 12 event

September 16 event

September 18 event

September 22 event

September 23 event

September 24 event

September 26 event

September 29 event

October

October 6 event

October 7 event

October 11 event

October 17 event

October 20 event

October 23 event

October 24 event

October 25 event

October 30 event

October 31 event

See also
Tornadoes of 2015
List of United States tornadoes in April 2015
List of United States tornadoes in May 2015
List of United States tornadoes from June to August 2015

Notes

References

Tornadoes of 2015
2015, 09
September 2015 events in the United States
October 2015 events in the United States